The Saint Lucia national rugby union team represents Saint Lucia in the sport of rugby union. Saint Lucia have thus far not played in a Rugby World Cup, but have participated in qualifying tournaments. They are classed as a tier-three nation by the International Rugby Board (IRB).

History
Saint Lucia played their first international friendly in 2008 against Dominican Republic which they lost 16-12 with tries coming from Tom Hotan and Andy Bucana. They won their first ever match in 3 years against Cayman Islands 33-0. They also got to the quarter-finals of the American Rugby Cup. They were knocked out by Brazil 25-3. They also got crushed 87-0 against Canada which they could not stop James Pritchard, Connor Braid and young Tyler Ardron. James Pritchard kicked 43 points. Also 20 year old Taylor Paris got the man of the match. They also lost 52-5 against Uruguay and Chile.

See also
 Rugby union in Saint Lucia

External links 
 Saint Lucia on IRB.com
 Saint Lucia on rugbydata.com
 Development of rugby in St Lucia
 Coach rugby in St Lucia

Rugby union in Saint Lucia
Caribbean national rugby union teams
R
2008 establishments in Saint Lucia